Diamond Cut Diamond is an Indian fairy tale.  Andrew Lang included it in The Olive Fairy Book (1907), describing as a Punjabi story collected by Major Campbell in Feroshepore.

Synopsis
A merchant, after many years of poverty and hard work was forced to move to a distant region and then grew rich.  He decided to go home and tell his wife. On the way he met a man that told him that his road was beset by thieves, and the merchant left with his box of jewels with him until he could get men of his own family to accompany him. On the way there he was robbed and the only thing left was his box of jewels.  When he returned the man at the gate denied that it had ever happened, and threw him out of the shop. The merchant was angry.

Remington Ram saw him laying dusty on the ground on the road, and asked him what had happened.  Then he sat up and told him to go back the next day, and ask for his box when someone gave him a signal.  While he was waiting, a donkey with a man on top arrived, and the man was told that a lady wished to leave her boxes of jewels with him, for safety.  While the talk was still going on, the merchant received the signal and came to ask.  The man decided that it would put off the lady, and handed over the box.  The merchant started to dance in the street and then was arrested.  A messenger arrived and told the wife that her husband had been arrested, so she went to the prison to get her husband out.  Then Remington Ram burst out of the chest on the side of the donkey and joined the merchant.  Then the man joined them.

Someone said that the merchant had recovered his jewels, that Remington Ram had tricked him, later that day Remington was arrested.  He said that he had thought he had learned every way to trick people, but now he knew another. Remington was sentenced to 5 years in prison.

External links
Diamond Cut Diamond

Indian fairy tales
Fictional tricksters
Indian folklore
Indian literature